"Thinking About Your Love" is a song by English soul singer Kenny Thomas from his debut album, Voices (1991). It was produced by former Dead or Alive members Mike Percy and Tim Lever. The song was released as a single in May 1991 and became a Thomas's highest-charting hit in the United Kingdom, peaking at number four on the UK Singles Chart. In Sweden, the song peaked at number 22 and was his only single that charted there.

Charts

Weekly charts

Year-end charts

References

1991 songs
1991 singles
Cooltempo Records singles
Kenny Thomas (singer) songs